The 1982–83 Rugby Football League season was the 88th ever season of professional rugby league football in Britain. Sixteen teams competed from August, 1982 until May, 1983 for the Slalom Lager Championship.

Season summary
Slalom Lager League Champions: Hull
Challenge Cup Winners: Featherstone Rovers (14-12 v Hull)
Slalom Lager Premiership Trophy Winners: Widnes (22-10 v Hull)
John Player Special Trophy Winners: Wigan (15-4 v Leeds)
2nd Division Champions: Fulham

Hull finished on top of the First Division table to claim their sixth and, to date, last championship, but Widnes won the Rugby League Premiership competition. Fulham, Wakefield Trinity, Salford and Whitehaven were promoted to the First Division.

Warrington beat St. Helens 16–0 to win the Lancashire County Cup, and Hull F.C. beat Bradford Northern 18–7 to win the Yorkshire County Cup.

League Tables

Championship
Final Standings

Second Division

Challenge Cup

The 1982-83 State Express Challenge Cup was won by underdogs Featherstone Rovers after defeating Hull F.C. 14-12 in the final.

The Final was played at Wembley before a crowd of 84,969.

League Cup

Premiership

Kangaroo Tour

The months of October and November also saw the appearance of the Australian team in England on their 1982 Kangaroo Tour. Other than the three test Ashes series against Great Britain (won 3–0 by Australia), The Kangaroos played and won matches against 9 Championship teams (Hull KR, Wigan, Barrow, St Helens, Leeds, Leigh, Bradford Northern, Hull and Widnes), 1 Second Division side (Fulham) and one county side (Cumbria).

The 1982 Kangaroos were coached by Frank Stanton who had previously toured as a player in 1963–64 and as coach of the 1978 Kangaroos. The team captain was veteran Manly-Warringah hooker Max Krilich who had also toured in 1978.

Souths Magpies centre Mal Meninga, making the first of a record 4 Kangaroo Tours as a player, was the leading point scorer on the tour with 166 from 10 tries and 68 goals including 48 points in the three Tests against Great Britain (2 tries, 21 goals). Manly-Warringah winger John Ribot was the leading try scorer on the tour with 25.

The 1982 Kangaroos became known as The Invincibles after becoming the first team to go undefeated on a Kangaroo Tour.

References

Sources
1982-83 Rugby Football League season at wigan.rlfans.com

1982 in English rugby league
1983 in English rugby league
Rugby Football League seasons
1982 in Welsh rugby league
1983 in Welsh rugby league